Priyaar Priyo is a 2017 Indian Assamese-language film directed by Munin Barua and produced by Azaan Films.

Cast 

 Zubeen Garg as Priyobrat Kakoti
 Aradhana Buragohain as Priya Baruah
 Pranjal Saikia as Brikodar Phukan
 Gunjan Bhardwaj as Priyonath Nath
 Sunita Kaushik as Hiya
 Bikram Rajkhowa as Priyo Ranjan Talukdar
 Nikumoni Baruah as Priya's mother
 Saurabh Hazarika as Bhaskar Borah
 Pabitra Baruah as Sripati
 Siddhartha Sharma as M.L.A. Priyo Ranjan's bodyguard
 Tridip Lahon
 Sasanka Samir

Awards

References

External links 

 

Assamese-language films
2017 films
2017 comedy films